Century Pharmaceuticals Ltd. is an Indian pharmaceutical company, founded in 1982 in Vadodara, Gujarat, India. 

Century Pharmaceuticals Ltd is in the business of manufacturing APIs for over three decades. Company offer various kinds of services in addition to supplies of APIs, we undertake long-term contracts for manufacturing intermediates and development of new Active Pharmaceutical Ingredients as per your requirement.

See also
 Pharmaceutical industry in India
 Torrent Pharmaceuticals
 Zydus Lifesciences
 Cadila Pharmaceuticals
 Alembic Pharmaceuticals

References

External links
Century Pharmaceuticals

Manufacturing companies of India
Pharmaceutical companies established in 1988
Companies based in Gujarat
Organisations based in Vadodara